Aretha Live at Fillmore  West is a live album by American singer Aretha Franklin. Released on May 19, 1971, by Atlantic Records. It was reissued on compact disc in 1993 through Rhino Records. An expanded, limited edition 4-CD box set entitled, Don't Fight the Feeling: The Complete Aretha Franklin & King Curtis Live at Fillmore West was released by Rhino in 2005. This was limited to 5000 numbered copies. In addition, there is a guest duet vocal by Ray Charles on "Spirit in the Dark".

Franklin played a Fender Rhodes piano on four cuts, including "Eleanor Rigby", "Spirit in the Dark", "Don't Play That Song" and "Dr. Feelgood". Backing Franklin was King Curtis' band, the Kingpins, featuring Cornell Dupree on guitar, Bernard Purdie on drums, and Jerry Jemmott on bass, Billy Preston on organ, Curtis on saxophone, together with the Memphis Horns. The album reached number one on the Billboard R&B album chart on June 19, 1971.

Background
The recording was made at the Fillmore West concert hall, the storied rock venue in San Francisco, over three nights, March 5, 6 and 7 in 1971. The album opens with Aretha's best-known song, her version of Otis Redding's "Respect". The album features Aretha's take on many "hippie" anthems as Aretha and Atlantic Records executive/album producer Jerry Wexler wanted to reach out to the expected hippie audience in San Francisco. Covers include the Bread song "Make it With You", the Stephen Stills song, "Love the One You're With", Diana Ross' "Reach Out and Touch (Somebody's Hand)", the Beatles' "Eleanor Rigby" and Simon and Garfunkel's "Bridge over Troubled Water".

Track listing

Original release

Don't Fight the Feeling: The Complete Aretha Franklin & King Curtis Live at Fillmore West
Disc 1
"Intro"
"Knock on Wood" – The Memphis Horns
"Whole Lotta Love" – King Curtis
"Them Changes" – King Curtis
"A Whiter Shade of Pale" – King Curtis
"My Sweet Lord" – Billy Preston
"Ode to Billie Joe" – King Curtis
"Mr. Bojangles" – King Curtis
"Soul Serenade" – King Curtis
"Memphis Soul Stew" – King Curtis
"Signed, Sealed, Delivered I'm Yours" – King Curtis
"Respect" – Aretha Franklin
"Call Me" – Aretha Franklin
"Mixed-Up Girl" – Aretha Franklin
"Love the One You're With" – Aretha Franklin
"Bridge Over Troubled Water" – Aretha Franklin
"Eleanor Rigby" – Aretha Franklin
"Make It with You" – Aretha Franklin
"Don’t Play that Song" – Aretha Franklin

Disc 2
"You're All I Need to Get By" – Aretha Franklin
"Dr. Feelgood" – Aretha Franklin
"Spirit in the Dark" – Aretha Franklin
"Spirit in the Dark" (reprise) – Aretha Franklin
"Knock on Wood" – The Memphis Horns
"Them Changes" – King Curtis
"Whole Lotta Love" – King Curtis
"A Whiter Shade of Pale" – King Curtis
"I Stand Accused" – King Curtis
"Soul Serenade" – King Curtis
"Memphis Soul Stew" – King Curtis
"Respect" – Aretha Franklin
"Call Me" – Aretha Franklin
"Love the One You’re with" – Aretha Franklin
"Bridge Over Troubled Water" – Aretha Franklin

Disc 3
"Share Your Love with Me" – Aretha Franklin
"Eleanor Rigby" – Aretha Franklin
"Make It With You" – Aretha Franklin
"You're All I Need to Get By" – Aretha Franklin
"Don't Play That Song" – Aretha Franklin
"Dr. Feelgood" – Aretha Franklin
"Spirit in the Dark" – Aretha Franklin
"Spirit in the Dark" (reprise) – Aretha Franklin
"Knock On Wood" – The Memphis Horns
"Them Changes" – King Curtis
"A Whiter Shade of Pale" – King Curtis
"Ode To Billie Joe" – King Curtis
"Soul Serenade" – King Curtis
"Memphis Soul Stew" – King Curtis

Disc 4
"Respect" – Aretha Franklin
"Call Me" – Aretha Franklin
"Love the One You're With" – Aretha Franklin
"Bridge Over Troubled Water" – Aretha Franklin
"Share Your Love with Me" – Aretha Franklin
"Eleanor Rigby" – Aretha Franklin
"Make It With You" – Aretha Franklin
"Don't Play That Song" – Aretha Franklin
"You're All I Need to Get By" – Aretha Franklin
"Dr. Feelgood" – Aretha Franklin
"Spirit in the Dark" – Aretha Franklin
"Spirit in the Dark" (reprise) – Aretha Franklin with Ray Charles
"Reach Out and Touch (Somebody’s Hand)" – Aretha Franklin

Rhino Handmade remastered 2005 liner notes:
Disc 1 tracks 01 to 19, and Disc 2 tracks 01 to 04 were recorded on March 5, 1971. 
Disc 2 tracks 05 to 15, and Disc 3 tracks 01 to 08 were recorded on March 6, 1971.  
Disc 3 tracks 09 to 14, and Disc 4 tracks 01 to 13 were recorded on March 7, 1971.

Personnel
Aretha Franklin – vocals, Fender Rhodes
Cornell Dupree – guitar
Jerry Jemmott – bass
Truman Thomas – piano
Billy Preston – organ
Bernard Purdie – drums
Pancho Morales – congas
King Curtis – saxophone, orchestra leader
Memphis Horns – horns
Brenda Bryant, Margaret Branch, Pat Smith – backing vocals
Arif Mardin – horn arrangements
Larry Wilcox – horn arrangement on "Make It With You"
Tom Dowd – horn arrangement on "Don't Play That Song"
Ray Charles – piano on "Spirit in the Dark"

Charts

Certifications

See also
List of Billboard number-one R&B albums of 1971

References

1971 live albums
Aretha Franklin live albums
Albums produced by Jerry Wexler
Albums arranged by Arif Mardin
Albums recorded at the Fillmore
Atlantic Records live albums